Susan May Pratt (born February 8, 1974) is an American actress. She played Mandella in 10 Things I Hate About You, Alicia in Drive Me Crazy, and Maureen Cummings in Center Stage.

Personal life
, Pratt was finishing her bachelor's degree in Business, while working on prerequisites for a master's program in occupational therapy at the University of Southern California.

She married actor Kenneth Mitchell in May 2006, with whom she has two children, a daughter, Lilah Ruby Mitchell, and son, Kallum Porter Mitchell.

Filmography

Film

Television

References

External links

1974 births
American practitioners of Brazilian jiu-jitsu
American film actresses
American television actresses
Living people
Actresses from Michigan
Parsons School of Design alumni
People from East Lansing, Michigan
20th-century American actresses
21st-century American actresses